General Intelligence Directorate may refer to:
 Dirección General de Inteligencia (General Directorate of Intelligence, Cuba)
 General Intelligence Directorate (Egypt)
 General Intelligence Directorate (Jordan)
 General Intelligence Directorate (Saudi Arabia)
 General Intelligence Directorate (Syria)
 General Directorate of Intelligence (Afghanistan)

See also
National Intelligence Service (disambiguation)
Foreign Intelligence service (disambiguation)
State Intelligence Service (disambiguation)
Federal Intelligence Service (disambiguation)
Directorate of Military Intelligence (disambiguation)
Intelligence Bureau (disambiguation)